The Class C10 is a type of 2-6-4T steam locomotive built by the Japanese Government Railways from 1930. A total of 23 Class C10 locomotives were built and designed by Hideo Shima . They were numbered C10 01-C10 23. They were operated until 1962. Only one member of the Class is preserved which is C10 8. It is preserved on the Ōigawa Railway. They would later form the basis of the JNR Class C11 in 1932.

Preserved examples
 C10 8 - Ōigawa Railway

See also
 Japan Railways locomotive numbering and classification

References
JNR Class C11

1067 mm gauge locomotives of Japan
Steam locomotives of Japan
2-6-4T locomotives
Kawasaki locomotives
Preserved steam locomotives of Japan
Railway locomotives introduced in 1930
Passenger locomotives